Richard White, 2nd Earl of Bantry DL (16 November 1800 – 16 July 1868), styled The Honourable from birth until 1816 and subsequently Viscount Berehaven until 1851, was an Irish peer and Conservative politician.

He was the eldest son of Richard White, 1st Earl of Bantry and his wife Margaret Ann, daughter of William Hare, 1st Earl of Listowel. White was educated at Christ Church, Oxford. In 1851 he succeeded his father as earl, and three years later he was elected a representative peer to the House of Lords, where he sat as a Conservative. White was High Sheriff of County Cork in 1835 and served as a Deputy Lieutenant of the same county.

On 11 October 1836, he married Mary, third daughter of William O'Brien, 2nd Marquess of Thomond at St George's, Hanover Square. White died, aged 67, childless at Exmoor House and was succeeded in his titles by his younger brother William.

References

1800 births
1868 deaths
Alumni of Christ Church, Oxford
Deputy Lieutenants of County Cork
Earls in the Peerage of Ireland
Irish representative peers
High Sheriffs of County Cork
People from Bantry
Conservative Party (UK) hereditary peers